Hazel Buckham (December 27, 1888 – September 4, 1959) was an American stage and early silent film actress.

Biography
Hazel Buckham was born on December 27, 1888, in Minneapolis, Minnesota, the only child of Adam and Ida Buckham. Her father was an electrician who had emigrated from Canada at an early age. He married Ida Cummins, a native of New York, in 1886 and by 1910 the two along with their daughter had relocated to Los Angeles.

Hazel Buckham began her acting career with the Ferris Stock Company in road productions that toured the American East Coast. While engaged at New York’s Morosco Theatre in 1912, Buckham was recruited by Biograph Studios to appear in films. She would go on to play in nearly forty motion pictures over the following few years with Biograph, American, Broncho, Kay-Bee and Universal studios. 

She was the wife of actor Joe King and the mother of Joleen King; an actress who appeared in a handful of movies between 1939 and 1950. Hazel Buckham left acting not long after the birth of her daughter and remained in Los Angeles where she died on September 4, 1959, at the age of 70.

Filmography

 His Squaw (1912)
 The Mosaic Law (1913)
 The Lost Dispatch (1913)
 The Sins of the Father (1913)
 A Southern Cinderella (1913)
 Bread Cast Upon the Waters (1913)
 A Wartime Mother's Sacrifice (1913)
 The Bondsman (1913)
 Exoneration (1913)
 The Open Door (1913)
 Eileen of Erin (1913)
 From Father to Son (1914)
 The Boob's Honeymoon (1914)
 Captain Jenny, S.A. (1914)
 For the Family Honor (1914)
 The House Across the Street (1914)
 The Senator's Bill (1914)
 In the Eye of the Law (1914)
 The Ruby Circle (1914)
 A Boob Incognito (1914)
 Mountain Law (1914)
 A Man, a Girl and Another Man (1914)
 Aurora of the North (1914)
 A Boob There Was (1914)
 The Fox (1914)
 Swede Larson (1914)
 The Awakening (1914)
 A Law Unto Himself (1914)
 The House Discordant (1914) Also known as His Father's Son (USA)
 The Weird Nemesis (1915)
 The Shriek in the Night (1915)
 A Life at Stake (1915)
 A White Feather Volunteer (1915)
 The Wanderers (1916)
 Liberty (1916) Also known as Liberty, A Daughter of the U.S.A. and The Fangs of a Wolf

References

External links

American silent film actresses
1888 births
1959 deaths
Actresses from Minnesota
20th-century American actresses